Sarduiyeh District is a district (bakhsh) in Jiroft County, Kerman Province, Iran. At the 2006 census, its population was 25,485, in 5,077 families.  The district has one city: Darb-e Behesht. The district has three rural districts (dehestan): Dalfard Rural District, Gevar Rural District, and Sarduiyeh Rural District.

References 

Jiroft County
Districts of Kerman Province